The Primetime Emmy Award for Outstanding Structured Reality Program is handed out annually at the Creative Arts Emmy Award ceremony.

In 2014, Outstanding Reality Program was separated into two categories – Outstanding Unstructured Reality Program and Outstanding Structured Reality Program. The category of "structured reality program" is defined as consisting of reality shows that "contain consistent story elements that mostly adhere to a recurring structured template".

In the following list, the first titles listed in gold are the winners; those not in gold are nominees, which are listed in alphabetical order. The years given are those in which the ceremonies took place:

Winners and nominations
Outstanding Reality Program

2000s

2010s

Outstanding Structured Reality Program

2020s

Programs with multiple wins

5 wins
 Queer Eye

4 wins
 Shark Tank

2 wins
 Extreme Makeover: Home Edition
 Kathy Griffin: My Life on the D-List
 Undercover Boss

Programs with multiple nominations
Totals include nominations for Outstanding Documentary or Nonfiction Series.

20 nominations
 Antiques Roadshow

11 nominations
 Shark Tank

8 nominations
 MythBusters

7 nominations
 Undercover Boss

6 nominations
 Kathy Griffin: My Life on the D-List
 Diners, Drive-Ins and Dives

5 nominations
 Extreme Makeover: Home Edition
 Queer Eye
 Who Do You Think You Are?

3 nominations
 Lip Sync Battle

2 nominations
 Dirty Jobs
 Dog Whisperer
 Fixer Upper
 Jamie Oliver's Food Revolution
 Love Is Blind
 Queer Eye for the Straight Guy
 Taxicab Confessions

See also
 Critics' Choice Television Award for Best Structured Reality Show

References

Structured Reality Program
American reality television series